Khwab Ki Duniya is a 1937 Hindi fantasy film produced and directed by Vijay Bhatt for Prakash Pictures. The music director was Lallubhai Nayak with lyrics written by Pandit Anuj. The film starred Jayant, with costars Sardar Akhtar, Umakant, Zahur, Lallubhai, Shirin and Ismail.

Khwab Ki Duniya was inspired by the film  The Invisible Man (1933) based on H. G. Wells novel of the same name. The film marked the "directorial debut" of Vijay Bhatt.

Cast
 Jayant
 Sardar Akhtar
 Miss Shirin Banu
 Umakant
 Zahur
 Madhav Marathe
 Ismail

Production
The film had elaborate special effects with the invisible man being the main draw. Babubhai Mistry trained as a special effects director with Vijay Bhatt when they worked together and was acclaimed as a "trick scene photographer" for  his work in Khwab Ki Duniya and for his work in Hatim Tai (1956) for Homi Wadia's Basant Pictures. The use of the black thread (Kaala Dhaaga) for the special effects scenes in Khwab Ki Duniya earned him the moniker of "Kaala Dhaaga".

Soundtrack
The lyrics of the film were written by Pandit Anuj with music composed by Lallubhai Nayak. The singers were Rajkumari, Ranjit Rai, Shirin, Ismail Azad and Lallubhai Nayak.

Song List

References

External links

1937 films
1930s Hindi-language films
Indian fantasy films
Films directed by Vijay Bhatt
1937 fantasy films
Indian black-and-white films
1937 directorial debut films